Mushāhid Aḥmad Bāyampūrī (1907–1971) was a Bengali Muslim theologian, teacher, writer and politician. He was a member of the 3rd National Assembly of Pakistan as a representative of Sylhet-II.

Early life and education
Mohammad Mushahid Ahmad was born on a Friday in Muharram 1327 AH (1907 CE), in the village of Bayampur in Kanaighat, Sylhet District, British Raj. He was the second child of the three sons of his father Qari Alim bin Danish Mian and mother Hafiza Sufia Begum. His father died in his childhood, so he was raised mostly by his mother. Locals referred to him as Kalamanik due to his dark skin tone and large nose.

Bayampuri studied the Qur'an, Bengali and Urdu with his mother at the age of seven years. At that age, he was then enrolled to the local school at Bayampur and later at the Kanaighat Islamia Madrasa (now Darul Uloom Kanaighat) from the age of ten.

He began his career as a teacher after completing his studies at the madrasa but returned to education later on in North India. He studied for five years at the Madrasa Aliya of Rampur State and two year at the Alia Madrasa of Meerut. He wrote two books in this period which were published under the name of his teacher. Although he went back to teaching in Bengal after these seven years, Mushahid later enrolled at the Darul Uloom Deoband in Saharanpur in 1936 where he graduated with a degree and got the highest mark in Hadith studies after one and a half years of studying there.

Career
Bayampuri briefly taught at the Lalarchak Primary School before spending seven years at North India. He gave Hadith studies classes at the Alia madrasas of Badarpur and Rampur. Prior to his studies at Deoband, he taught at his local Lalarchar Rahmania Madrasa too.

When he returned to Bengal, he was offered a position as Shaykhul Hadith at the Sylhet Government Alia Madrasah. He also served in this position at the Gachhbari Jamiul Uloom Kamil Madrasa, and during his term here, this madrasa was nicknamed The Second Darul Uloom Deoband. However, as he did not get on well with the management at Gachhbari, Bayampuri left the madrasa to join the Kanaighat Islamia Madrasa in 1953. He eventually became the principal and Shaykhul Hadith of this madrasa until his death, and renamed it to Darul Uloom Kanaighat. In order to unite the madrasas of eastern Sylhet (Sylhet and Moulvibazar), he established the Azad Dini Arabic Madrasa Education Board in 1953. He served as the board's president for the rest of his life. The board now has authority over 175 madrasas. In Ramadan, he used to give lectures at the Bandarbazar Jame Mosque from tarawih to suhur.

Political career
As a student of Hussain Ahmed Madani, Bayampuri rejected the Pakistan Movement and Partition of India. After the independence of Pakistan in 1947, Bayampuri continued to be a part of the Jamiat Ulema-e-Islam. He participated in the 1962 basic elections as an independent candidate, defeating opponent Begum Serajunnessa Choudhury and successfully gaining a seat in the 3rd National Assembly of Pakistan representing Sylhet-II constituency.

During his term, he felt that the strength of Islamic parties were even close to the strength needed to change the political landscape. As a result, he joined Ayub Khan's Convention Muslim League for the greater good. He benefitted by taking grants from the government for funding Kanaighat Darul Uloom and Akuni Madrasa. However, joining this party made him unpopular. He lost this seat at the 1965 basic elections to Ajmal Ali Choudhury. At the 1970 Pakistani general elections, Bayampuri competed for the seat as a Jamiat Ulema-e-Islam candidate but failed for a second time.

During his time in parliament, Bayampuri petitioned for the erstwhile Republic of Pakistan to rename itself to Islamic Republic of Pakistan. He also believed that no law should be adopted by Pakistan which goes against the Qur'an and Sunnah. In the face of his demand, the Ayub Cabinet was forced to cancel the anti-Islamic clause from an ordinance. Bayampuri also called for the establishment of an Islamic university in East Pakistan. In one part of his political career, Bayampuri briefly left Pakistan for Assam in India due to political oppression. A Pakistani minister later invited him back to the country after a compromise by the King of Saudi Arabia.

Works
Mushahid Ahmad has written a number of works in Arabic, Urdu and Bengali:
al-Fatḥ al-Karīm fī Siyāsah an-Nabī al-Amīn (1948, Urdu). (Translated into Bengali by Abu Saeed Muhammad Omar Ali as Islamer Raśṭrīyô O Ôrthônoitik Uttôradhikar)
al-Furqān bayna al-Ḥaqq wa al-Bāṭil fī ʿIlm at-Taṣawwuf wa al-Iḥsān
al-Furqān bayna Awliyāʼ ar-Raḥmān wa Awliyāʼ ash-Shayṭān
Śôtter Alo (2 vols)
Islame Bhoṭ o Bhoṭer Ôdhikar
Semā al-Qurʼān
Iẓhār-e-Ḥaqq
al-Laṭāʼif ar-Rabbāniyyah fī Sūrah Tafsīr al-Fatiḥah

Personal life
Bayampuri married 10 times, and is the father of 11 children.
He completed Hajj three times. On one occasion, the King of Saudi Arabia gave him the state constitution for review and Bayampuri suggested that it be amended at 14 places.

Although he was a student of both Ashraf Ali Thanvi and Hussain Ahmed Madani, he gained khilafah (spiritual succession) from his other teacher Shah Muhammad Yaqub Badarpuri, who was a disciple of Hafiz Ahmad Jaunpuri and teacher of Abdul Latif Chowdhury Fultali. Bayampuri's murid/khalifahs were Darul Uloom Kanaighat's Muhtamim Shahrullah and Muhammad bin Idris, Muhtamim Abdul Karim Chhatrapuri of Lafnaut Madrasa, Muhtamim Habibur Rahman of Gachhbari Muzahirul Uloom and Muhtamim Tayyabur Rahman of Shitalang Shah Madrasa.

Death and legacy
Bayampuri died in his village, on the night of Eid al-Adha on 7 February 1971. His janaza was performed on Eid day, after the Asr prayer, and he was buried in front of Darul Uloom Kanaighat. It was reported that a strong fragrance came out of his grave a few days later.

A bridge on the Surma River in Kanaighat Upazila is named after Bayampuri. He has been praised by numerous scholars and is mentioned in various books. During Bayampuri's return from Assam to Sylhet, Hussain Ahmed Madani mentioned that "an enlightenment is going towards Sylhet". Abdul Karim Shaykh-e-Kouria mentioned that if all of the ilm of the scholars of Sylhet District were put together, they would match only up to the knee of Bayampuri.

His son, Sheikhzada Faruq Ahmad, contested in the 1973 Bangladeshi general elections losing only to Habibur Rahman (Tota Mia).

See also
Ibrahim Ali Tashna, another Islamic scholar of Kanaighat

References

Bibliography

Pakistani MNAs 1962–1965
1971 deaths
1907 births
People from Kanaighat Upazila
20th-century Bengalis
20th-century Muslims
Darul Uloom Deoband alumni
Jamiat Ulema-e-Islam politicians
Bengali Muslim scholars of Islam
Academic staff of Sylhet Government Alia Madrasah
Deobandis